Catling is an English surname that may also refer to a kitten, a juvenile cat. Notable people with the surname include:

Brian Catling (b. 1948), English sculptor, poet, novelist, film maker, and performance artist
Hector Catling (1924–2013), British archaeologist
Patrick Skene Catling (born 1925), British children's book author and book reviewer
Richard Catling (1912–2005), British police officer in British Palestine and Commissioner of Police in Kenya
Richard W. V. Catling British archaeologist, son of archaeologist Hector W. Catling
Thomas Catling (b. 1839), editor of Lloyd's Weekly News, author of My Life's Pilgrimage (1911)
Thomas Thurgood Catling (b. 1863), son of Thomas Catling, editor for Lloyd's News and other journals

It may also refer to:

Catlin (surgery), a long, double-bladed surgical knife